A number of Akira Kurosawa's films have been remade.

Note: This list includes full remakes only; it does not include films whose narratives have been loosely inspired by the basic plot of one or more of the director's films – as A Bug's Life (1998) references both Seven Samurai (1954) and its Hollywood remake The Magnificent Seven (1960) – nor movies that adopt, adapt, or parody individual plot elements or characters from a Kurosawa film without adapting the entire film, as Star Wars (1977) did with The Hidden Fortress (1958).

The 1999 movie Inferno (Desert Heat) with Jean Claude Van Damme is also a remake of Yojimbo. It was directed by John G. Avildsen who asked his name to be changed from the credits to Danny Mulroon because of creative differences.

The information below is derived from the Akira Kurosawa's IMDb page and the director's filmography by Galbraith (2002).

Table

Footnotes

References

External links

Remakes
Remakes of Japanese films
Lists of films based on works
Adaptations of works by Akira Kurosawa